Potamomusa aquilonia is a moth in the family Crambidae. It was described by Yoshiyasu in 1985. It is found in Japan (Hokkaido).

References

Acentropinae
Moths described in 1985